McNeece is a surname. Notable people with the surname include:

Francis McNeece Whittle (1823–1902), American Anglican bishop
Jimmy McNeece, American boxer
Tom McNeece (born 1958), American boxer, brother of Jimmy